Brickellia microphylla, the littleleaf brickellbush, is a flowering plant species in the family Asteraceae native to western North America.

Distribution and habitat
The plant is widespread across much of the Western United States and Northwestern Mexico. It is found from California and Baja California east to New Mexico and Colorado, and north to Washington, Idaho, and Wyoming.

Brickellia microphylla var. scabra has a more eastern and southern distribution in the species' range, and grades into Brickellia microphylla var. microphylla in southern and central Utah and eastern California.

Description
Brickellia microphylla is a shrub  in size.

It produces many small, pale yellow flower heads pale yellow, often purple-tinged. They are often clumped together at the ends of branches.  The bloom period is July to October.

Varieties
Varieties, which can intergrade, include:
 Brickellia microphylla var. microphylla — Littleleaf brickellbush, native to California, Baja California (México), Arizona, Colorado, Idaho, Nevada, Oregon,  Utah, Washington, and Wyoming.
 Brickellia microphylla var. scabra A.Gray — Rough brickellbush, native to southeastern California, Baja California, Arizona, Colorado, Nevada, New Mexico, Sonora (México), Utah, and Wyoming.
 Brickellia microphylla var. watsonii — Watson's brickellbush, native to southeastern California, Arizona, Nevada, Utah.

References

External links
 Calflora Database: Brickellia microphylla (Little leaved brickellia,  Littleleaf brickellbush)
 Jepson Manual eFlora (TJM2) treatment of Brickellia microphylla
 USDA Plants Profile for Brickellia microphylla (littleleaf brickellbush)
 UC CalPhotos gallery of Brickellia microphylla

microphylla
Flora of the Northwestern United States
Flora of the Southwestern United States
Flora of Baja California
Flora of California
Flora of New Mexico
Flora of Sonora
Flora of the Great Basin
Natural history of the Mojave Desert
Natural history of the Transverse Ranges
Plants described in 1840
Taxa named by Asa Gray
Taxa named by Thomas Nuttall
Flora without expected TNC conservation status